Andrew Leota is a Tongan rugby footballer who represented Tonga in rugby league at the 2000 World Cup.

Playing career
Leota originally played rugby league, being named in the Tonga squad for the 2000 World Cup and representing Coastline between 1997 and 2001. He played for the Ngongotaha Chiefs in the 2000 Bartercard Cup.

Leota played for the Te Paamu club in Coastline Rugby League and Waicoa Bay competitions.

In 2003, Leota switched codes to rugby union and in 2004 he made his debut for the Bay of Plenty Rugby Union in the National Provincial Championship. By 2006 Leota was playing for Bay of Plenty B.

References

Bay of Plenty rugby union players
Coastline rugby league team players
Living people
Ngongotaha Chiefs players
Tonga national rugby league team players
Tongan rugby league players
Tongan rugby union players
Waicoa Bay Stallions players
Tongan expatriate rugby union players
Expatriate rugby union players in New Zealand
Tongan expatriate sportspeople in New Zealand
Rugby league props
Year of birth missing (living people)